Songpa is a station on the Seoul Subway Line 8.

Vicinity
Exit 1 : Jamsil Girls' High School
Exit 2 : Jungdae Elementary School
Exit 3 : Garak Market
Exit 4 : Garak Elementary School

Station layout

Metro stations in Songpa District
Seoul Metropolitan Subway stations
Railway stations opened in 1996